Aamish is an Indian DJ and music producer who is also known as Varun Khullar (born February 9, 1991). He is the first and only disabled DJ from India.

Early life 
Aamish was born in Delhi on February 9, 1991, to engineer couple Amit Khullar and Shashi Khullar. He completed his schooling from ITL Public School Dwarka, New Delhi and graduated from Delhi University, Delhi in Bachelor of Arts (Foreign Trade and International Practices). Varun met with an accident and was paralysed while he was pursuing his master's degree from Amity University, Noida.

Musical career 
Varun Khullar, a.k.a Aamish, began his musical career in 2014. In 2014, Varun had an accident. But he was a mass communication student who wanted to become a DJ, and he didn't let his dream die with his accident. He learned music from books and did that for two years. He joined ILM Academy in Gurgaon in 2016. In 2017, he joined Kitty Su, Delhi as a DJ. He has performed at TimeOut 72 event in Goa.

Discography

Singles 
 Interstellar
 Interstellar - Aleksandr Kashnikov Remix
 Bhuddhabrot
 Dimensions of Space

Achievements 
In 2017 - Epic Wards

In 2018 - Bharat Prerna Awards

In 2018 - tedxahlconintlschool

in 2019 - Limca Book of Records

References

External links 
 Official Website
 Aamish on Spotify
 Aamish on Apple Music
 Aamish on Soundcloud

Living people
21st-century Indian musicians
Indian DJs
1991 births
Indian electronic musicians
Musicians from Delhi
Electronic dance music DJs